Silvana Estrada (born April 15, 1997) is a Mexican musician and songwriter. She has released three albums, including two with collaboration from musician Charlie Hunter. Additionally, she has worked with artists like Natalia Lafourcade, Caloncho, Alex Cuba, and Guitarricadelafuente, among others.

Early life
Estrada was born in Coatepec, Veracruz in Mexico, her parents were both luthiers, she began playing music at a young age, later performing in different bars from her hometown. At 16, she was accepted into a jazz program at the Universidad Veracruzana in Xalapa, Veracruz. While she was still studying, she started to write songs playing a Venezuelan cuatro from her father after not being able to connect with the piano while composing, currently she still uses the cuatro as one of the main instruments in her music.

Career
While attending a jazz seminar where she performed some of her compositions, she met American musician Charlie Hunter who proposed her to work with him, they recorded the album Lo Sagrado at a cabin of Estrada's parents in Coatepec, the album was released in 2017 and later re-released in 2020. In 2018, Estrada worked in a second album with Hunter titled Charlie Hunter/Carter McLean Featuring Silvana Estrada, the album was recorded in the United States and also features American drummer Carter McLean. Also in 2018, Estrada released the four-song EP Primeras Canciones. During 2019, she embarked on a Mexican tour and performed with artists like Natalia Lafourcade, Mon Laferte, and Julieta Venegas.

In 2020, she was signed to American label Glassnote Records, becoming the first Latin American artist signed to the label. On January 21, 2022, she released Marchita, her first solo album and third album overall. The album was produced by Gustavo Guerrero and received critical acclaim upon release. To promote the album, she embarked on a solo tour through the United States.

Estrada shared the 2022 Latin Grammy Award for Best New Artist with Angela Alvarez at the 23rd Annual Latin Grammy Awards

Influences
Estrada has cited American jazz singers Billie Holiday and Sarah Vaughan as influences when she started being interested with music. Furthermore, her vocal delivery and style has been influenced by Latin American folk singers like Chavela Vargas, Mercedes Sosa and Toña la Negra.

Discography

Solo studio albums
 Marchita (2022)

Collaborative albums
 Lo Sagrado with Charlie Hunter (2017)
 Charlie Hunter/Carter McLean Featuring Silvana Estrada with Charlie Hunter and Carter McLean (2018)

EPs
 Primeras Canciones (2018)
 Abrazo (2022)

Awards and nominations

References 

Mexican musicians
Glassnote Records artists
1997 births
Living people
Women in Latin music
Latin Grammy Award winners
Latin Grammy Award for Best New Artist